Nova Zembla is a 2011 Dutch historical drama film directed by Reinout Oerlemans. It is the first Dutch  feature film in 3D.

The film describes the last journey of Willem Barentsz and Jacob van Heemskerk through 1596–1597 when they and their crew tried to discover the Northeast Passage to the Indies. However, due to the sea ice, they are stranded on the island of Novaya Zemlya and have to spend the winter there in Het Behouden Huys (The Safe Home). The story is told through the eyes of Gerrit de Veer, and is loosely based on a diary he published in 1598 after his safe return. Gerrit is portrayed as having a relationship with Catharina Plancius, the daughter of the astronomer, cartographer and reverend Petrus Plancius, who pioneered the concept of the North East passage to reach the Indies. The Novaya Zemlya effect, first described by De Veer, is shown in the film, albeit in a non-historical fashion.

Cast
 Robert de Hoog as Gerrit de Veer
 Derek de Lint as Willem Barentsz
 Victor Reinier as Jacob van Heemskerk
 Jan Decleir as Petrus Plancius
 Doutzen Kroes as Catharina Plancius
 Semmy Schilt as Claes

Filming locations 
The film was filmed on location in Iceland, Belgium, Canada and the Netherlands. The scenes set in Amsterdam were filmed in Bruges (Brugge).

Critical response 

According to Variety, the screenplay was "too light on historical background and character development," while the movie was "coming off as a technically competent but narratively uninvolving History Channel-like reenactment." The acting was considered "weak."

Soundtrack 
The musical theme of the movie was remixed by Dutch DJ and producer Armin van Buuren.

See also 
 Boat Trip 3D (2008), the first Dutch digital 3D short film

References

External links
  
 
 Russian ship ‘Shtandart’ as the ship of Willem Barents

2010s historical drama films
Dutch 3D films
Films based on actual events
Films set in 1596
Films set in 1597
Films set in the Netherlands
Films set in Russia
Films set on islands
Films shot in Bruges
Films shot in Canada
Films shot in Iceland
Age of Discovery films
Films set in the Dutch Golden Age
Dutch historical drama films
2010s survival films
Cultural depictions of explorers
Cultural depictions of Dutch men
2011 drama films
2011 films
Films set in the Arctic
Novaya Zemlya